The Partition of Iraq refers to a number of proposed geopolitical partitions of varying severity of the nation of Iraq. Such a partition has been proposed in a "soft form" (in which Iraq becomes a federal state) and a "hard form" (in which Iraq becomes three separate countries, one for Sunni Arabs in western Iraq, one for Kurds in northern Iraq, and one for Shi'a Arabs in southern Iraq). The subject is controversial and has had heavy discussion in the Western media since the 2003 invasion of Iraq.

Supporters of this idea
In addition to both Joe Biden and Leslie H. Gelb, prominent supporters of the idea of a soft partition of Iraq have included Edward P. Joseph and Michael E. O'Hanlon as well as Iraqi business mogul Khamis Khanjar, former Mosul Province governor Atheel al-Nujaifi, former Iraqi Finance Minister Rafaa al-Issawi, and Ali Khedery (who was described in a 2016 New York Times article as "an American former official in Iraq who served as an aide to several ambassadors and generals"). Meanwhile, in a 2015 New York Times article, former U.S. Ambassador to the United Nations and then-future U.S. National Security Advisor John Bolton endorsed the idea of a hard partition of Iraq to defeat ISIS. In a 2015 World Affairs article, U.S. journalist and author Michael J. Totten likewise endorsed allowing Iraq to die through partition, arguing that doing this would be comparable to removing "an expiring, cancerous nation" from life support.

Arguments in favor

In a 2006 New York Times article, U.S. Senator and future U.S. Vice President and U.S. President Joe Biden and correspondent and U.S. government official Leslie H. Gelb put forward an argument in favor of a soft partition of Iraq that would transform Iraq into a federal state, or federation, along ethnoreligious lines. In this article, Biden and Gelb involved the partition of Bosnia and Herzegovina as a result of the Dayton Accords following the Bosnian War to be a success story that allowed the people of Bosnia and Herzegovina to go on with their lives and for their country to recover after years of extremely bloody and brutal warfare. Biden and Gelb advocated allowing each of Iraq's main groups–specifically Sunni Arabs, Kurds, and Shi'a Arabs–to run their own affairs while leaving the Iraqi central government in charge of their common interests. Elaborating on this, Biden and Gelb argued that the Kurdish, Sunni and Shiite regions within a federal Iraq would all have their own domestic laws, administration, and internal security whereas the Iraqi central government would control border defense, foreign affairs, and oil revenues, with Baghdad becoming a federal zone while densely populated areas with mixed religious demographics would get both multi-sectarian and international police protection to significantly reduce the risk of religious and ethnic tensions and violence there. Biden and Gelb argue that while critics might say that their plan would result in ethnic cleansing, ethnic cleansing has already been underway in Iraq and thus their plan would change nothing in this regard other than possibly making additional ethnic cleansing and an outright hard partition of Iraq less likely down the road. Supporters of partition also point out that not all partitions have either resulted in bloodshed or ended badly, with the 1993 partition of Czechoslovakia, Slovenia's 1991 secession from Yugoslavia, and most of the break-up of the Soviet Union being both successful and peaceful cases of partition. In addition, Biden and Gelb's proposal also called for Sunni Arabs to receive 20% of all revenues in Iraq since this would be proportional to their share of the total Iraqi population. Their proposal also called for an increase in U.S. aid to Iraq but making this increase condition on respect for the rights of women and ethnoreligious minorities, especially but not only in Iraq's Shi'a-majority southern region. Finally, Biden and Gelb advocated for the calling of a religional conference under international or U.N. aegis for Iraq's neighbors to guarantee both Iraq's borders and the new federal arrangement that they proposed for Iraq in this article.

Criticism of this idea
In a 2016 article, Ben Connable strongly criticized the idea of partitioning Iraq in both its soft and hard forms. First of all, Connable points out that neither Iraqi Sunni Arabs nor Iraqi Shi'a Arabs–and, for that matter, none of Iraq's prominent political factions–actually want the partition of Iraq, in either its soft or hard forms. This is something that is also confirmed in Iraqi opinion polls. Connable points out that Iran, the biggest beneficiary of expanded influence in Iraq in the event of a U.S. withdrawal from there, likewise does not seek the partition of Iraq and that in any case neither the United States nor any other country would actually be able to order Iraq's leadership to partition their country against their own will.

Connable also points out that even if the partition of Iraq were somehow accomplished, the Shi'a-led government in the southern, rump part of Iraq would be even less willing to cooperate with Iraq's Sunni Arabs if they were a part of an independent state as opposed to if they remained a part of Iraq. In addition, he argues that the scale of ethnic cleansing that is likely to take place after a partition of Iraq, whether soft or hard, is likely to be much worse than the scale of the ethnic cleansing that was currently happening in Iraq. In this regard, Connable's argument is shared by Robert Mackey, who pointed out to the terrible effects that partition and the ethnic cleansing that subsequently accompanied it previously had in Ireland, India, Palestine, and South Sudan. In a 2015 article, Vox journalist Max Fisher likewise invokes the extreme violence and forced displacement that occurred as a result of the partition of India as an argument against partitioning Iraq. Anthony Cordesman argues that Iraq does not have clear and neatly dividing internal ethnoreligious borders and as well as no reliable ethnoreligious census data, with Daniel Serwer arguing that in the event of a hard partition of Iraq, war could break out over disputed, vital, important, and ethnically mixed areas.

Meanwhile, Ben Connable also raises other problems with partition, such as the question of why exactly an independent rump Shi'a-majority state in southern Iraq would actually be willing to share some of the profits from its vast oil reserves with a poor, backward, landlocked, and possibly hostile independent Sunni Arab state in western Iraq, especially if this Shi'a-majority state actually saw things through a sectarian lens, which is a necessary precondition for any partition of Iraq. In addition, in a 2006 article of his on openDemocracy, Reidar Visser pointed out that Iraqi Shi'a Arabs do not view themselves as a molithic group and that ever since the summer of 2004, local Shi'a Arab politicians in the oil-rich areas of Basra, Amarah, and Nasiriya have advocated the creation of a small Iraqi federal unit limited to these three southernmost provinces of Iraq so that they would not have to be ruled over and dominated by other Iraqi Shi'a Arabs further to the north.

References

External links
A list of articles discussing a hypothetical soft partition of Iraq from between 2006 and 2009

Separatism in Iraq
Iraq
Divided regions
Partition (politics)
Proposals in Asia
Public policy proposals